Storie is the surname of the following people:
Ava Storie, a ring name of Brandi Lauren Pawalek (born 1996), an American model and professional wrestler
Craig Storie (born 1996), Scottish football player
Frank Storie, Australian rugby league footballer 
Howie Storie (1911–1968), American backup catcher in Major League Baseball
Jerry Storie (born 1950), Canadian politician 
Katy Storie (born 1979), English rugby union player